Aalisha Panwar is an Indian actress who appears in television shows known for her work in Colors TV's thriller Ishq Mein Marjawan. In 2021, she played Avneet in Zee TV's Teri Meri Ikk Jindri.

Early life
Panwar is from Shimla, Himachal Pradesh. Her mother, Anita Panwar, is a teacher at Chapslee School Shimla, and her father, Dinesh Panwar, is a lawyer.

In 2008, she participated in DD National's Nachein Gaen Dhoom Machaen. In 2012, she was crowned The Shimla Queen.

Career
Panwar started her acting career in 2012 with the film Akkad Bakkad Bambe Bo. She made her television debut as Najma in Begusarai in 2015. In 2016, she played Aditi in Thapki Pyar Ki. She also worked in Jamai Raja and Rishton Ki Saudagar - Baazigar. From 2017 to 2019, Panwar portrayed Tara Raichand and Aarohi Kashyap in Ishq Mein Marjawan. Her next role was as a deceased character Madhuri Shirke in Star Bharat's Meri Gudiya. Panwar was seen short films Blind Love opposite Shagun Pandey and Ishqiyaat opposite Rrahul Sudhir. In 2023, she entered Kumkum Bhagya as Kaya.

Filmography

Films

Television

Special appearances

Music videos

Awards and nominations

References

External links

 

21st-century Indian actresses
Actresses from Himachal Pradesh
Indian television actresses
1996 births
Living people